Raymond "Ray-Ray" McCloud III (born October 15, 1996) is an American football wide receiver and return specialist for the San Francisco 49ers of the National Football League (NFL). He played college football at Clemson.

Early years
McCloud attended Sickles High School in Tampa, Florida and played on the Gryphons football team as a running back. As a senior, he rushed for 1,933 yards and 17 touchdowns. For his high school career, he had 5,765 rushing yards and 58 touchdowns. He committed to play football for the Clemson Tigers in July 2014, choosing them over the likes of Alabama, Auburn, and Florida.

College career
As a freshman in 2015, McCloud played in 12 games, catching 29 passes for 251 yards and one touchdown. He missed three games due to a knee injury.

In 2016, as a sophomore, McCloud played in 14 of Clemson's 15 games, missing one due to an ankle injury. In those 14 games, he tallied 49 receptions for 472 yards and two touchdowns, helping
Clemson win the National Championship.

As a junior in 2017, McCloud played in all 14 of Clemson's games, tallying 49 receptions for 503 yards and one touchdown. He also returned 25 punts for 303 yards and one touchdown. After the season, he declared for the 2018 NFL Draft.

Collegiate statistics

Professional career

Buffalo Bills
McCloud was drafted by the Buffalo Bills in the sixth round with the 187th overall pick in the 2018 NFL Draft. In Week 3, in a 27–6 victory over the Minnesota Vikings, he made his first professional reception and had a 13-yard punt return.

On August 31, 2019, McCloud was waived by the Bills.

Carolina Panthers
On September 1, 2019, McCloud was claimed off waivers by the Carolina Panthers. He was waived on October 15, 2019.

Buffalo Bills (second stint)
On October 17, 2019, McCloud was signed to the Buffalo Bills practice squad. In addition to serving as a wide receiver, McCloud served as the scout team quarterback, emulating the style of mobile quarterbacks the Bills face that week. He signed a reserve/future contract with the Bills on January 6, 2020. He was waived on July 27, 2020.

Pittsburgh Steelers
On August 21, 2020, McCloud signed with the Pittsburgh Steelers. McCloud signed a one-year contract extension with the Steelers on March 11, 2021.  McCloud became the Steelers' primary return specialist, returning 28 kickoffs for 646 yards and 29 punts with an average of 10.7 yards. He was named by Pro Football Focus on its All-Pro roster as a second-team return specialist.

In 2021, McCloud led the NFL in total punt-return yards gained.

San Francisco 49ers
On March 22, 2022, McCloud signed a two-year contract with the San Francisco 49ers.

References

External links
Pittsburgh Steelers bio
Buffalo Bills bio
Clemson Tigers bio

1996 births
Living people
Players of American football from Tampa, Florida
American football wide receivers
Clemson Tigers football players
Buffalo Bills players
Carolina Panthers players
Pittsburgh Steelers players
San Francisco 49ers players